What's New!!! (subtitled Sonny Stitt Plays the Varitone) is an album by saxophonist Sonny Stitt recorded in 1966 and released on the Roulette label. The album represents Stitt's first recorded use of the varitone, an electronic amplification device which altered the saxophone's sound.

Reception

What's New!!! reached number 172 on the Billboard 200 in April 1967 and number 16 on the Jazz Albums chart. Allmusic awarded the album 3 stars.

Track listing 
All compositions by Sonny Stitt except as indicated
 "What's New?" (Bob Haggart, Johnny Burke) - 2:20   
 "Jumpin' with Symphony Sid" (Lester Young) - 3:55   
 "Stardust" (Hoagy Carmichael, Mitchell Parish) - 6:06   
 "Cocktails for Two" (Arthur Johnston, Sam Coslow) - 3:28   
 "Georgia" (Carmichael, Stuart Gorrell) - 4:11   
 "Mame" (Jerry Herman) - 2:10   
 "Morgan's Song" - 2:31   
 "Fever" (Eddie Cooley, John Davenport) - 2:05   
 "Round About Midnight" (Thelonious Monk) - 3:12   
 "I've Got the World on a String" (Harold Arlen, Ted Koehler) - 4:17   
 "If I Didn't Care" (Jack Lawrence) - 4:50   
 "The Beastly Blues" - 4:50

Personnel 
Sonny Stitt - alto saxophone, tenor saxophone, varitone
Joe Wilder, Eddie Preston - trumpet
J. J. Johnson - trombone
Illinois Jacquet - tenor saxophone
George Berg - baritone saxophone
Billy Taylor, Ellis Larkins - piano 
Wild Bill Davis, Ernie Hayes - organ
Mike Mainieri - vibraphone
Les Spann - guitar
Jan Arnet, George Duvivier - bass 
Walter Perkins - drums

References 

1966 albums
Roulette Records albums
Sonny Stitt albums